Oud Gastel is a village situated in the municipality of Halderberge, in the north-west of the North Brabant province in the Netherlands.

The village was first mentioned in 1278 as Gestele, and means "guest house". Oud (old) has been added to distinguish from the former village Nieuw Gastel. Oud Gastel is a stretched out settlement which developed in the Late Middle Ages.

The Catholic St Laurentius Church was built in 1906 to replace its predecessor. The tower of the old church remained and dates from 1483. The tower was restored between 1952 and 1959.

Oud Gastel was home to 581 people in 1840. Prior to 1997, the village was part of the Oud- en Nieuw-Gastel municipality.

Gallery

References

Populated places in North Brabant
Halderberge